Nicole Whippy (1977 or 1978) is a New Zealand actress who has been in a number of television series and is best known for her role as Kasey Mason in the hit comedy-drama Outrageous Fortune. She is also known for her current role as Cece King in New Zealand's longest-running drama television series Shortland Street. Whippy made her directing debut on feature film Vai which premiered at the Berlin International Film Festival in 2019. Since then she has directed 2 series of well-loved New Zealand children's series Fejioa Club.

Career
She has appeared in various shows including Jackson's Wharf, The Strip, Being Eve, Mercy Peak and Orange Roughies.

In 2011, she starred in the series Nothing Trivial as hard-nosed Michelle Hardcastle.

Voiced character "Navali" in online video game "Path of Exile"

In 2019, she starred as Cece King, a social worker who dealt with her mother-in-law's dementia and eventual death, her husband's sexual assault allegations, and her daughter's pyromania. She also revealed that her mother is a maternal mental health nurse .

Filmography

Film

Television

Activism
In the campaign for the New Zealand general election, 2011, Whippy attended a policy launch by the Green Party.

References

External links
 

Living people
1977 births
New Zealand actresses
New Zealand film actresses
New Zealand television actresses
Fijian emigrants to New Zealand